This article details the fixtures and results of the Indonesia national football team in 2010.

Record

Managers of 2010

Goal scorers

Schedule

Friendly matches

2010 AFF Cup finals

2011 AFC Asian Cup qualification

2010
2010–11 in Indonesian football
2009–10 in Indonesian football
Indonesia